Gregorio Luperón International Airport , also known as Puerto Plata Airport, is located in Puerto Plata, Dominican Republic. It is the Dominican Republic's fourth busiest airport by passenger traffic and aircraft movements, after Punta Cana, Santo Domingo and Santiago de los Caballeros airports. The airport is named after General Gregorio Luperón, a Dominican military and state leader. Capable of handling planes of all sizes, Puerto Plata Airport has benefited from being in an area with many beaches, which are popular among charter airline passengers. The popularity of the city where it is located has also drawn a number of regularly scheduled passenger airlines over the years.

History 
The facility opened in 1979 with the purpose of boosting tourism in the North region, it has a runway 3,081 meters long x 46 meters wide, with the capacity to receive wide-body aircraft, including B-747 and A-340.

Facilities
The main terminal building has 10 gates: 5 with boarding bridges on the satellite concourse, and 2 boarding bridges and 3 without in the frontal concourse. The terminal was recently remodeled with new floors, escalators, immigration hall, departure hall and duty-free areas along with restaurants.  The terminal can support 4 Boeing 747-400s simultaneously after renovations to the airport made in 2013/14.

Airlines and destinations

Passenger

Cargo

Notes
 Condor's flight from Puerto Plata to Frankfurt flies via Santo Domingo, however, the flight from Frankfurt to Puerto Plata is nonstop.

Statistics

Incidents
On February 6, 1996, Birgenair Flight 301 was bound for Frankfurt, Germany, but crashed shortly after take-off from Puerto Plata Airport into the Atlantic Ocean 26 kilometres off-shore. All 176 passengers and 13 crew members, among them 164 Germans, were killed. It was discovered later that one of the air speed indicators of the Boeing 757-200 was not working properly, confusing the pilots about whether the aircraft's speed was too fast or too slow.

See also 
Transport in Dominican Republic
List of airports in Dominican Republic
List of the busiest airports in the Caribbean

References

External links 

OpenStreetMap – Puerto Plata
Aeropuerto Internacional Gregorio Luperón

Buildings and structures in Puerto Plata Province
Airports in the Dominican Republic
Puerto Plata, Dominican Republic
Airports established in 1979
1979 establishments in the Dominican Republic